The 2016 Women's Asian Champions Trophy was the fourth edition of the Women's Asian Champions Trophy. The tournament was held in Singapore. The top five Asian teams (China, India, Japan, South Korea and Malaysia) participated in the tournament which involved round-robin league among all teams followed by play-offs for final positions.

Qnet was the official sponsor of the 2016 Asian Women's Hockey Champions Trophy.

Umpires
Seven umpires were selected to officiate at the tournament:

Neutral Umpires
Ornpimol Kittiteerasopon (THA)
Toh Li Min (SIN)

National Umpires
Nirmala Dagar (IND)
Kim Yoon Sung (KOR)
Xiaoying Liu (CHN)
Junko Wagatsuma (JPN)

Umpires
Ayu Zainuddin (MAS)

Results
All times are Singapore Standard Time (UTC+8)

Round robin

Classification

Third place game

Final

Final standings

See also
2016 Men's Asian Champions Trophy

References

External links
 Series home at International Hockey Federation

Women's Asian Champions Trophy
Asian Champions Trophy
Asian Champions Trophy
International women's field hockey competitions hosted by Singapore
Asian Champions Trophy
Asian Champions Trophy